Fieldale Historic District is a national historic district located at Fieldale, Henry County, Virginia. The district encompasses 329 contributing buildings and 2 contributing structures in the town of Fieldale.  The majority of the buildings were built after 1916-1917 by the Marshall Field and Company as workers housing for the Fieldcrest Mills.  Other notable buildings and structures include the Fieldcrest Mills Complex with the upper mill, lower mill, gatehouse, warehouse, water infiltration plant, and welder's shop; Danville & Western Station; Route 701 Bridge; Bank of Fieldale/Post Office; Fieldale Café (Fieldale Grocery; former Theater/Drug Store; Ramona's Dress Shop/Wilson's Grocery
Store; Fieldale Elementary School (1924); Fieldale High School (1941); Fieldale Community Center (1937); Fieldale Hotel, and Fieldale Baptist Church. The former gas station building that houses Peggy's Antiques (044-5173-0186) was built by the Lustron Manufacturing Company. Also located in the district and separately listed are the Marshall Field and Company Clubhouse and Virginia Home.

It was listed on the National Register of Historic Places in 2008.

References

Historic districts on the National Register of Historic Places in Virginia
Buildings and structures in Henry County, Virginia
National Register of Historic Places in Henry County, Virginia